Air Chief Marshal (Ret.) Hadi Tjahjanto (born 8 November 1963) is the Minister of Agrarian and Spatial Planning of Indonesia under President Joko Widodo's Onward Indonesia Cabinet. He is a former officer in the Indonesian Air Force who previously served as the 20th Commander of the Indonesian National Armed Forces. An alumnus of the Indonesian Air Force Academy and Flight School, he was appointed by president Joko Widodo in 2017 as the Commander of the Armed Forces (Panglima).

Formerly also a military secretary to President Joko Widodo, the president nominated him to the People's Representative Council as the sole candidate for the Commander of the Indonesian National Armed Forces (Panglima TNI), replacing Gatot Nurmantyo. He was formally appointed on 8 December 2017.

He is the second officer from Air Force after Air Chief Marshal Djoko Suyanto to hold the similar office in TNI history.

Early career

Hadi's father Bambang Sudardo served as a personnel in Abdurrahman Saleh airbase, motivating him to join the Air Force Academy following his graduation from high school. He became a pilot after completing the academy and flight school by 1987, initially becoming a pilot in the same airfield his father served at Malang.

After several years of operating CASA C-212 light airlift planes, he was promoted to squadron training officer in 1993, and began operating heavier planes by 1996. He was squadron commander by 1997, moving to Adisumarmo Airport in Surakarta and later to Adisucipto as he continued going up the ranks. Between 2010 and 2011, he was commander of the Adisumarmo airbase, where he became familiar with then-mayor of Surakarta Joko Widodo. He continued to be the spokesman of the air force (2013) and commander at Abdurrahman Saleh (2015). After Jokowi's election, he was appointed military secretary to the president on 25 July 2015 and obtained a promotion to air vice-marshal.

Central command

After his time under the Ministry of State Secretariat, he became the inspector general of the Ministry of Defense and obtained a promotion to air marshal. During his time at the defense ministry, he helped uncover a corruption in the purchase of F-16 and Apache helicopters, where a brigadier general was eventually prosecuted and found guilty.

On 20 January 2017, Jokowi appointed him as the new chief of staff of the Air Force to replace the retiring Agus Supriatna. His name had been nominated as one of three by TNI Commander Gatot Nurmantyo. Along with this promotion, he was made air chief marshal.

Due to Gatot's scheduled retirement in 2018, on 4 December 2017 Jokowi (through Secretary of State Pratikno) submitted a letter to the People's Representative Council through deputy chairman Fadli Zon, nominating Hadi as the sole candidate to replace him.

He was formally inaugurated on 8 December 2017, making him the second TNI commander to hail from the air force after Djoko Suyanto between 2006 and 2007.

On 26 October 2021, Hadi was awarded an honorary Officer of the Order of Australia (AO) (Military Division)

Post-military career 
He was appointed as field commander of Mandalika International Street Circuit in January 2022 by Joko Widodo for 2022 Indonesian motorcycle Grand Prix.

On June 22, He was appointed to replace Sofyan Djalil as Minister of Agrarian and Spatial Planning in Onward Indonesia Cabinet.

See also
Panglima

References

1963 births
Commanders of the Indonesian National Armed Forces
Living people
People from Malang
Indonesian Air Force air marshals
Chiefs of Staff of the Indonesian Air Force